Penllyn (LLR) railway station is the northern terminus of the Llanberis Lake Railway (LLR), located near Llanberis, Gwynedd, Wales. The station has no platforms and passengers are not allowed to board or alight.

Most of the LLR was laid around 1970 on part of the trackbed of the closed and lifted Padarn Railway. For thirty years Gilfach Ddu (LLR) was the new line's southern terminus, situated a short distance south of the site of the Padarn Railway's former workmen's station, also named Gilfach Ddu. In 2003 a wholly new extension was opened south westwards, with  station as the line's new southern terminus. With this extension Gilfach Ddu (LLR) changed from a terminus to a through station.

Penllyn (LLR) is situated a short distance south of the site of the former Padarn Railway  workmen's station.

The line and station primarily serve tourists and railway enthusiasts.

References

Sources

External links

 The station and line in Llanberis Lake Railway
 Edwardian 6" map showing the future station site, overlain with modern satellite images and maps in National Library of Scotland
 The station and line in Rail Map Online
 Images of the station and line in Yahoo

Railway stations in Great Britain opened in 1972
Llanberis
Heritage railway stations in Gwynedd
Railway stations built for UK heritage railways